Podlaska Wytwórnia Samolotów (PWS) - Podlasie Aircraft Factory - was a Polish aerospace manufacturer between 1923 and 1939, located in Biała Podlaska.

History
Podlaska Wytwórnia Samolotów SA was created in 1923. The first aircraft produced were 35 Potez 15 bombers for the Polish Air Force, under the French licence, built from 1925. By 1929 the works had produced 155 Potez 27 and 150 Potez 25, under French licence, and 50 PWS-A fighters, which was the Czech Avia BH-33 built under licence. It also produced 50 Bartel BM-4 trainers in 1931, designed by Samolot.

In 1925, a design office was established which included, among others, Stefan Cywiński, Zbysław Ciołkosz, August Bobek-Zdaniewski. Despite a large number of prototypes, few were produced in series. The first aircraft of their own design to be mass-produced was the PWS-10 fighter of 1930 of which 80 examples were built. Smaller production runs of the PWS-14 trainer  and the PWS-24 passenger aircraft were also made. The PWS-10 and PWS-24 were the first fighter and the first passenger plane of the Polish construction built in series, respectively. In 1929 the factory built a wind tunnel, the first in Poland. All PWS-designed aircraft had wooden or mixed construction.

In 1932 the PWS works were nationalized to prevent its bankruptcy. It then produced 500 RWD-8 trainers  (designed by RWD) and 50 of the British Avro Tutor under licence as the PWS-18 trainers. The factory then designed its own successful PWS-16 and PWS-26 advanced trainers, 320  of the latter built from 1936 to 1939.

In 1936 the factory was subordinated to the PZL national concern. It developed a series of projects for military planes, but they were not built due to outbreak of World War II. The PWS-33 Wyżeł twin-engine advanced trainer and the PWS-35 sports biplane were ordered into production, but these plans were cancelled due to the war.

Lwowskie Warsztaty Lotnicze (LWL, Lwów Aviation Workshops) was formed in October 1937 as a division of PWS. It built gliders, among others designated with letters PWS. Some 160 gliders were built before the war.

After the outbreak of World War II, the PWS factory was bombed by the Germans on September 4, 1939, who destroyed about 70% of the factory. The remains of equipment have been plundered by the Soviets after their invasion of Poland.

Aircraft

References

Notes

Bibliography

 Glass, Andrzej. Polskie konstrukcje lotnicze 1893-1939 [Polish aviation designs 1893-1939]. Warsaw: WKiŁ, 1977 (no ISBN)

External links

 Podlaska Wytwórnia Samolotów – Muzeum Lotnictwa Polskiego 
 Podlaska Wytwórnia Samolotów / PWS – Samoloty w Lotnictwie Polskim 

Aircraft manufacturers of Poland
Second Polish Republic
Science and technology in Poland
Biała Podlaska
PWS aircraft
Companies set up in the Second Republic of Poland